Lip Sync Battle is an American musical reality competition television series that premiered on April 2, 2015, on the American cable network Spike, later known as Paramount Network. The show is based on an idea by Stephen Merchant and John Krasinski, in which celebrities battle each other with lip sync performances. The idea was introduced as a recurring segment on Late Night with Jimmy Fallon and later The Tonight Show Starring Jimmy Fallon, before being developed into a separate show. The premiere episode was the highest-rated premiere in Spike's history. Lip Sync Battle has been a hit show for the network.  The series' success has led to the creation of various international adaptations. In August 2018, the show was renewed for a fifth season which premiered on January 17, 2019. In September 2020, it was announced that the series would move to another ViacomCBS network as part of the Paramount Network's now-scrapped planned shift to films. However, no new home for the program has been announced since then.

During the course of the series, 91 episodes of Lip Sync Battle aired over five seasons, including five specials.

Series overview

Episodes

Season 1 (2015) 
Note: Winners are listed in bold

Christmas special (2015)

Season 2 (2016) 
Note: Winners are listed in bold

Live special (2016)

Season 3 (2016–17) 
Note: Winners are listed in bold

Hip Hop special (2017)

Soul Train special (2017)

Michael Jackson Celebration (2018)

Season 4 (2018) 
Note: Winners are listed in bold

Season 5 (2019) 
Note: Winners are listed in bold

References

External links 
 
 List of Lip Sync Battle episodes at the Internet Movie Database
 List of Lip Sync Battle episodes at TV Guide

Lists of American non-fiction television series episodes
Lists of reality television series episodes